Dhonkamana is a 2003 Maldivian horror film directed by Amjad Ibrahim. Produced under EMA Productions, the film stars Yoosuf Shafeeu, Sheela Najeeb, Fauziyya Hassan, Niuma Mohamed, Amira Ismail and Sheereen Abdul Wahid in pivotal roles.

Premise
Shahil (Yoosuf Shafeeu) decides to marry his girlfriend, Zaana (Sheela Najeeb) despite his mother's disapproval who planned to wed her son to her friend Zahidha's daughter, Anoosha (Amira Ismail). Shahil, however married Zaana and brought her to his home who in spite of her righteousness became tormented by her mother-in-law and Shahil's sister. She died during pregnancy and Shahil decided to relocate himself to an uninhabited island occupying himself in agriculture. There he meets an old lady, Kuda Dhaitha (Fauziyya Hassan) who agreed to take the job as a cook in the island where an unexpected romantic relationship grows between them.

Cast 
 Yoosuf Shafeeu as Shahil
 Sheela Najeeb as Zaana
 Niuma Mohamed as Zaana
 Fauziyya Hassan as Kuda Dhaitha
 Ibrahim Wisan as Shakeeb
 Waleedha Waleed as Shahil's sister
 Sheereen Abdul Wahid as Zoona
 Amira Ismail as Anoosha
 Aminath Rasheedha as Haleema
 Neena Saleem as Haleema's sister

Soundtrack

References

2003 films
2003 horror films
Maldivian horror films
Films directed by Amjad Ibrahim